Scopula timandrata is a moth of the  family Geometridae. It is found in Florida.

The wingspan is about 24–27 mm.

References

Moths described in 1861
timandrata
Moths of North America